Chan Hao-ching and Chan Yung-jan were the defending champions but Chan Hao-ching chose not to participate. Chan Yung-jan partnered with Janette Husárová, but they lost in the quarterfinals to Johanna Konta and Patricia Mayr-Achleitner.
Monica Niculescu and Klára Zakopalová won the title, defeating Lyudmyla Kichenok and Nadiya Kichenok in the final, 6-3, 6-4.

Seeds

Draw

Draw

References
 Main Draw

WTA Shenzhen Open - Doubles
2014 Doubles